Fartuni Nunatak (‘Nunatak Fartuni’ \'nu-na-tak f&r-'tu-ni\) is the narrow, rocky ridge extending 1.6 km in northwest-southeast direction, and rising to 927 m in Ivanili Heights on Oscar II Coast in Graham Land.  It is situated in the northwest part of Rogosh Glacier.  The feature is named after the settlement of Fartuni in Northern Bulgaria.

Location
British mapping in 1978.

Maps
 British Antarctic Territory.  Scale 1:200000 topographic map.  DOS 610 Series, Sheet W 64 60.  Directorate of Overseas Surveys, Tolworth, UK, 1978.
 Antarctic Digital Database (ADD). Scale 1:250000 topographic map of Antarctica. Scientific Committee on Antarctic Research (SCAR). Since 1993, regularly upgraded and updated.

Notes

References
 Fartuni Nunatak. SCAR Composite Antarctic Gazetteer.
 Bulgarian Antarctic Gazetteer. Antarctic Place-names Commission. (details in Bulgarian, basic data in English)

External links
 Fartuni Nunatak. Copernix satellite image

Nunataks of Graham Land
Oscar II Coast
Bulgaria and the Antarctic